Zodia is a genus of moths in the family Choreutidae.

Species
Zodia chrysosperma (Meyrick, 1931)
Zodia ochripalpis (Meyrick, 1920)
Zodia plutusana (Walker, 1863)
Zodia rutilella (Walker, 1863)
Zodia scintillana (Walker, 1863)

External links
choreutidae.lifedesks.org

Choreutidae